Bill Bolender is an American character actor and artist, mainly known for small appearances in RoboCop 2, JFK, Reality Bites, The Shawshank Redemption, Nixon and Dante's Peak.

His guest starring appearances include roles in The Adventures of Brisco County, Jr., Walker, Texas Ranger, Star Trek: Deep Space Nine (as an Albino alien in the episode "Blood Oath"), NYPD Blue, Alias, Deadwood and in the Desperate Housewives episode "No One Is Alone". He also had a recurring role as Captain Ross in JAG.

Other credits

Motion picture credits

Television credits

References

External links
 
 
 Bill Bolender's Art Website

American male film actors
American male television actors
Living people
1940 births
People from Chicago